Shattuckite is a copper silicate hydroxide mineral with formula Cu5(SiO3)4(OH)2. It crystallizes in the orthorhombic – dipyramidal crystal system and usually occurs in a granular massive form and also as fibrous acicular crystals.  It is closely allied to plancheite in structure and appearance.

Shattuckite is a relatively rare copper silicate mineral. It was first discovered in 1915 in the copper mines of Bisbee, Arizona, specifically the Shattuck Mine (hence the name). It is a secondary mineral that forms from the alteration of other secondary minerals. At the Shattuck Mine, it forms pseudomorphs after malachite. A pseudomorph is an atom by atom replacement of a crystal structure by another crystal structure, but with little alteration of the outward shape of the original crystal. It is sometimes used as a gemstone.

Gallery

References

Copper(II) minerals
Inosilicates
Orthorhombic minerals
Minerals in space group 61
Gemstones